This is a list of notable Imams or Sheikh in Nigeria, from past to present.

Notable Imams

IZALA
 Abubakar Mahmud Gumi
 Ahmad Abubakar Gumi
 Dr. Abdul-Fattah Abu-Abdullah Adelabu
 Ja'afar Mahmud Adam
 Isa Ali Pantami
 Kabiru Gombe
 Sani Yahaya Jingir
 Ahmed Lemu
 Muhammad Sani Umar (Rijiyar Menu)

SUNNA 

 Sheikh Dahiru Usman Bauchi
 [[Sheikh Sharif Ibrahim Sale Alhusaini]
 Sheikh Qaribullah Nasiru Kabara
 Nasiru Kabara

Shi'a 

 Ibrahim Zakzaky
 Abdul jabbar Nasiru Kabara 

Imams
Islam in Nigeria
Imams in Nigeria